Clinidium humile is a species of ground beetle in the subfamily Rhysodinae. It was described by R.T. Bell & J.R. Bell in 1985. It is known from "New Granada", which could be in either present-day Colombia or Panama. What now is the holotype of Clinidium humile was originally identified by Louis Alexandre Auguste Chevrolat as Clinidium cavicolle of "the other sex".

References

Clinidium
Beetles of South America
Beetles described in 1985